Ansett Airlines of Papua New Guinea was a Papua New Guinea airline and Ansett subsidiary founded in 1936 as Mandated Airlines.

History 
Ansett Airlines of Papua New Guinea was established in 1936 as Mandated Airlines when W.R. Carpenter & Co (Aerial Service) merged with Pacific Aerial Transport. The airline began operations from Salamaua. The airline was one of many companies established to link the goldfields of New Guinea to points in Australia. In February 1942 the airline ceased operations due to the Japanese invasion of Papua New Guinea with some aircraft being lost, however the airline re-started operations in 1945. In the aftermath of the war Mandated Airlines began to acquire and incorporate other airlines such as: Island Airways in 1948 and Gibbes Sepik Airways and Madang Air Services in 1960.

In January 1961 Mandated Airlines was purchased by Ansett Australian and subsequently re-branded as Ansett MAL with its route network and fleet remaining unchanged. Ansett MAL operated throughout Papua New Guinea in combination with other airline subsidiaries such as TAA Sunbird and SAATS East Indonesia. In 1968 the airline was renamed again, with Ansett Airlines of Papua New Guinea being the airlines final name. In 1970 the airline acquired Papuan Airlines. The airline finally ceased operations in 1973.

Destinations 
Throughout its existence Ansett Airlines of Papua New Guinea operated to:
Aitape
Ambunti
Anogram
Banz
Brisbane
Bulolo
Cairns
Erave, (Papua New Guinea), (Kagua-Erave District]]) 
Goroka
Hayfield
Ialibu
Kagua
Kavieng
Kundiwa
Lae
Lumi
Madang 
Melbourne
Mendi
Minj
Momote
Mt Hagen
Nuku
Port Moresby
Rabual
Sydney
Tari
Telefomin
Townsville 
Vanimo
Wabag
Wapenamenda
Wau
Wewak
Yangoru

Fleet 

Throughout its existence Ansett Airlines of Papua New Guinea operated:

 Avro 642
 Bristol Freighter 
 Cessna 336
 De Havilland Dragon
 De Havilland Dove
 De Havilland Canada DHC-6 Twin Otter
 De Havilland Canada DHC-4 Caribou 
 Douglas C-47
 Douglas DC-3
 Douglas DC-6
 Fokker F.27
 Let L-200 Morava
 Lockheed 414
 Piaggio P.166
 Short Skyvan

Accidents and Incidents 

 On July 17, 1972 a Douglas C-47 veered off a runway after the aircraft's gear collapsed. The aircraft's crew escaped unharmed. 
 On September 1, 1972, a Short Skyvan crashed on northeastern slope of Mt Giluwe due to poor visibility. Four people died as result of the crash.
 On October 30, 1972, a DC-3 overran the runway at Madang Airport after the aircraft encountered difficulties trying decelerate properly. There were no casualties but the aircraft was written off.

References 

Defunct airlines of Papua New Guinea
Defunct airlines of Australia
Airlines established in 1936
Airlines disestablished in 1973
Ansett Australia